Gustav Rümelin (26 March 1815 – 28 October 1889) was a German statistician, pedagogue and author.

Biography
Rümelin was born in Ravensburg. After studying theology at Tübingen, he devoted himself to teaching, became rector of a Latin school in 1845, and became professor at the gymnasium of Heilbronn in 1849, having in the meanwhile been a delegate to the Frankfurt Parliament in 1848. Called to Stuttgart in 1850 to serve in the Board of National Education, he was head of a department in the Ministry of Public Instruction from 1856 to 1861, when he became director of the Statistic-Topographical Bureau. In 1867 he established himself as docent at the University of Tübingen and was appointed its chancellor in 1870. Aside from various statistical and miscellaneous publications, he produced Shakespeare-Studien (2d ed. 1874), a much valued contribution to the Shakespeare literature. He died in Tübingen.

Notes

References

External links

German statisticians

1815 births
1889 deaths
German male writers